Thyrotropin releasing hormone degrading enzyme is a protein, specifically a pyroglutamyl-peptidase II enzyme, that in humans is encoded by the TRHDE gene.

Function 

This gene encodes a member of the peptidase M1 family. The encoded protein is an extracellular peptidase that specifically cleaves and inactivates the neuropeptide thyrotropin-releasing hormone.

References

Further reading 

 
 
 
 
 

Genes on human chromosome 12